Texas's 38th congressional district is a congressional district in Texas, covering parts of Harris County. It includes the Houston suburbs of Jersey Village, Cypress, Tomball, Katy, and Klein. The Memorial Villages and a portion of the city of Houston are also located within the district.

The district was created in the redistricting after the 2020 census, where Texas gained two seats in the House. The district was first contested in the 2022 House elections, sending a member to the 118th United States Congress.

History 
The district was created as a result of the 2022 redistricting to account for rapid growth in Harris County during the previous decade, and includes many of the most Republican areas in Houston and Harris County, including much of the Katy Freeway corridor west of downtown Houston. The southern portion of the district - including Memorial City and the neighboring Memorial Villages, the Energy Corridor and the adjacent Addicks and Barker reservoirs, all or parts of the wealthy River Oaks, Rice Military and Tanglewood neighborhoods of west Houston, Memorial Park and the eastern parts of the Greater Katy area - was long considered the traditional base of the 7th district from 1967 to 2023 that was once the most Republican district in the Houston area, as well as the home district of former President George H.W. Bush during his presidency and post-presidential years. The northern portion of the district, which extends from the neighborhoods directly north of U.S. Highway 290 (known locally as the Northwest Freeway) including such suburbs as Jersey Village, Tomball, Klein and parts of Cypress, had boomeranged between several Republican-friendly districts over the years (mostly involving the 7th and 8th districts, as well as the 2nd and 10th districts during the first two decades of the 21st century), while otherwise maintaining their largely Republican leans as the area became increasingly suburbanized.

The district's first incumbent is Republican Wesley Hunt, an African-American Republican, former Army officer and West Point and Cornell University graduate who narrowly lost in the 7th District to one-term Democratic incumbent Lizzie Fletcher in 2020, the latter having defeated longtime Republican incumbent John Culberson in the same district two years prior; Hunt conceded the race the day after the election. Having initially being pegged for a rematch against Fletcher in 2022, Hunt wound up running in the new 38th District that was reportedly designed to elect him in redistricting talks (and which as aforementioned takes much of the historical west Houston base of the old 7th. Hunt easily won the 2022 Republican primary over nine other candidates with over 50 percent of the vote, and easily defeated former Spring Branch ISD superintendent Duncan Klussmann in the general election, becoming the first Black Republican to represent the Houston area in Congress since Reconstruction.

List of members representing the district

Election results

2022

See also

Texas's congressional districts
List of United States congressional districts

References

38
Constituencies established in 2023
2023 establishments in Texas